David Anthony Rice (June 8, 1951 – December 25, 2020), known professionally as Tony Rice, was an American guitarist and bluegrass musician. He was an influential acoustic guitar player in bluegrass, progressive bluegrass, newgrass and acoustic jazz. He was inducted into the International Bluegrass Music Hall of Fame in 2013.

Rice's music spans the range of acoustic from traditional bluegrass to jazz-influenced New Acoustic music to songwriter-oriented folk. Over the course of his career, he played alongside J. D. Crowe and the New South, David Grisman (during the formation of "Dawg Music") and Jerry Garcia, led his own Tony Rice Unit, collaborated with Norman Blake, recorded with his brothers Wyatt, Ron, and Larry, and co-founded the Bluegrass Album Band. He recorded with drums, piano, soprano sax, as well as with traditional bluegrass instrumentation.

Early years
Rice was born in Danville, Virginia but grew up in Los Angeles, California, where his father, Herb Rice, introduced him to bluegrass. Tony and his brothers learned the fundamentals of bluegrass and country music from L.A. musicians like the Kentucky Colonels, led by Roland and Clarence White. Clarence White in particular became a huge influence on Rice. Crossing paths with fellow enthusiasts like Ry Cooder, Herb Pedersen and Chris Hillman reinforced the strength of the music he had learned from his father.

Groups

In 1970, Rice had moved to Louisville, Kentucky where he played with the Bluegrass Alliance, and shortly thereafter, J.D. Crowe's New South. The New South was known as one of the best and most progressive bluegrass groups—eventually adding drums and electric instruments (to Rice's displeasure). When Ricky Skaggs joined them in 1974, however, the band recorded J. D. Crowe & the New South, an acoustic album that became Rounder Records' top-seller up to that time. At this point, the group consisted of Rice on guitar and lead vocals, Crowe on banjo and vocals, Jerry Douglas on Dobro, Skaggs on fiddle, mandolin, and tenor vocals, and Bobby Slone on bass and fiddle.

Around this time, Rice met mandolinist David Grisman, who played with Red Allen during the 1960s and was now working on original material that blended jazz, bluegrass, and classical styles. Rice left the New South and moved to California to join Grisman's all-instrumental group. As part of the David Grisman Quintet, in order to broaden his expertise and make himself more marketable, Rice began studying chord theory, learned to read charts, and began to expand his playing beyond bluegrass. Renowned guitarist John Carlini came in to teach Rice music theory, and Carlini helped him learn the intricacies of jazz playing and musical improvisation, in general. The David Grisman Quintet's 1977 debut recording is considered a landmark of acoustic string band music.

In 1980, Rice, Crowe, Bobby Hicks, Doyle Lawson and Todd Phillips formed the Bluegrass Album Band and recorded from 1980 to 1996.

With the Tony Rice Unit, he pursued experimental "spacegrass" music on Mar West, Still Inside, and Backwaters. Members of the Unit included Jimmy Gaudreau (mandolin), Wyatt Rice (guitar), Ronnie Simpkins (bass), John Reischman (mandolin), and Rickie Simpkins (fiddle). In the late 1980s Alison Krauss played regularly with the group in concert for about a year but never appeared on the albums. Alison Brown also guested with the group during that period.

Collaborations
In 1980, he recorded an album of bluegrass duets with Ricky Skaggs, called Skaggs & Rice. Two albums with traditional instrumentalist and songwriter Norman Blake garnered acclaim, as well as two Rice Brothers albums (1992 and 1994) that featured him teamed with his late elder brother, Larry, and younger brothers, Wyatt and Ronnie.

Beginning in 1984, Rice collaborated on four albums by Béla Fleck – Double Time (Béla Fleck album) (1984), Drive (Béla Fleck album) (1988), Tales from the Acoustic Planet (1995), and The Bluegrass Sessions: Tales from the Acoustic Planet, Vol. 2 (1999).

He joined David Grisman and Jerry Garcia in 1993 to record The Pizza Tapes. In 1994 Rice and Grisman recorded Tone Poems, an original collection of material, where they used historical vintage mandolins and guitars, different for each track.

In 1994, Rice joined Mark Johnson to record "Clawgrass Mark Johnson with the Rice Brothers and Friends" which featured Tony as well as his late brother Larry Rice and his other brothers Wyatt and Ronnie.

In 1995, Rice recorded a duo album with John Carlini, who also played with the David Grisman Quintet.

In 1997, Rice, his brother Larry, Chris Hillman (formerly of the Flying Burrito Brothers and the Byrds) and banjoist Herb Pedersen founded the so-called "anti-supergroup" Rice, Rice, Hillman & Pedersen and produced three volumes of music between 1997 and 2001.

In the 2000s and 2010s, he performed as a quartet with guitarist/singer-songwriter Peter Rowan, bassist Bryn Bright (later known as Bryn Davies), and mandolinist Billy Bright (replaced by Sharon Gilchrist).

Solo career
In 1979, Rice left Grisman's group to record Acoustics, a jazz-inspired album, and then Manzanita, a bluegrass and folk album. A similar combination was evident on  Cold on the Shoulder, Native American, and Me & My Guitar, albums which combined bluegrass, jazzy guitar work, and the songwriting of Ian Tyson, Joni Mitchell, Phil Ochs, Tom Paxton, Bob Dylan, and Gordon Lightfoot.

Rice's singing voice was a distinctive baritone.  In 1994 he was diagnosed with a disorder known as muscle tension dysphonia and as a result was forced to stop singing in live performance.  A 2014 diagnosis of lateral epicondylitis ("tennis elbow") made guitar playing painful and Rice's last performance playing guitar live was his induction into the International Bluegrass Music Hall of Fame in 2013.  In 2015, Rice was quoted as saying "I am not going to go back out into the public eye until I can be the musician that I was, where I left off or better.  I have been blessed with a very devout audience all these years, and I am certainly not going to let anybody down.  I am not going to risk going out there and performing in front of people again until I can entertain them in a way that takes away from them the rigors and the dust, the bumps in the road of everyday life."

The authorized biography of Tony Rice, titled Still Inside: The Tony Rice Story, written by Tim Stafford and Hawaii-based journalist Caroline Wright, was published by Word of Mouth Press in Kingsport, Tennessee, United States in 2010. The book's official release took place at Merlefest in North Carolina.

Death
Rice died at his home in Reidsville, North Carolina, on December 25, 2020, at age 69. He died while making his coffee, according to a statement from longtime friend and collaborator Ricky Skaggs.

Rice’s 2013 induction into the International Bluegrass Hall of Fame reportedly was the last time he played guitar in public due to the lateral epicondylitis that affected his ability to play in his last years.

Influence 
Tony Rice is said to have “redefined bluegrass guitar playing and left a lasting imprint on the genre." David Grisman called Rice “a complete musician of the highest caliber", and Ricky Skaggs said he was “the single most influential acoustic guitar player in the last 50 years."

In a guitar lesson exploring Rice's style, Molly Tuttle noted "the beauty of Tony’s playing is that there’s something for everyone to learn from. I’ve been playing guitar for a long time, and I still go back to this and just want to listen to him strum the guitar." Rice was a big influence on the bluegrass band Punch Brothers who devoted their album Hell On Church Street as a tribute to Rice and to Rice's 1983 album Church Street Blues. Members of the Punch Brothers band said that Rice's earlier album had a huge impact on their music. In addition, guitarist Chris Eldridge was a student of Rice's. The group had intended that their album be a  surprise gift to Rice, but Rice died before they could finish it.

Discography

Awards

Grammy
 Best Country Instrumental Performance – The New South, Fireball – 1983

IBMA
 Hall of Fame Inductee, 2013
 Instrumental Performer of the Year – Guitar – 1990, 1991, 1994, 1996, 1997, 2007
 Instrumental Group of the Year – The Tony Rice Unit – 1991, 1995
 Instrumental Group of the Year – Bluegrass Album Band – 1990
 Instrumental Album of the Year – Bluegrass Instrumentals, Volume 6 (Rounder); Bluegrass Album Band  – 1997

References

External links
Classicweb.com
Tony Rice discography at Deaddisc.com
 

1951 births
2020 deaths
People from Danville, Virginia
Singers from Virginia
American acoustic guitarists
American male guitarists
American bluegrass guitarists
American jazz guitarists
Grammy Award winners
American male singers
Rebel Records artists
Rounder Records artists
Country musicians from Virginia
Songwriters from Virginia
Songwriters from California
Guitarists from Los Angeles
Guitarists from Virginia
20th-century American guitarists
Jazz musicians from Virginia
Jazz musicians from California
Country musicians from California
20th-century American male musicians
American male jazz musicians
David Grisman Quintet members
Bluegrass Album Band members
New South (band) members
Bluegrass musicians from North Carolina
American male songwriters